Loosegalu is a 2013 Indian Kannada-language romantic comedy film directed by Arun and starring Sriimurali, Shreeki, Akul Balaji, Aishwarya Nag, Shravya Rao, and Rekha Vedavyas. The film began production as Nande and was delayed for two-and-a-half years before the title was changed.

Cast 
Sriimurali as Kabir
Shreeki as Buji
Akul Balaji as Shankar
Aishwarya Nag as Milky
Shravya Rao
Rekha Vedavyas as Maggie

Soundtrack
This film marks the debut of Vani Harikrishna, wife of V. Harikrishna, as a music director.

Release and reception
The film was initially scheduled to release on 19 July before the date was pushed to 26 July.

A critic from Sify opined that "The director has made an honest attempt to showcase youths and their troubles, but the movie falls short of expectations and in the process fails to impress the audience". A. Sharadhaa of The New Indian Express stated that "A moral lesson of sorts, Loosegalu tries to tell us about what happens when we try to take shortcuts to success but it loses track on the way". A critic from The Times of India wrote that "The movie has a good theme to deal with, but the narration is too slow and many times lengthy keeping you guessing what the director wants to say".

References

2013 films
Indian romantic comedy films
2010s Kannada-language films